The Upholders of the Message, (Risalyun) is an Iraqi political list that ran in the December 2005 elections. This list won 1.2% of the popular vote, thus receiving two seats. The members are supporters of Muqtada al-Sadr and they were allowed to join the United Iraqi Alliance primary election for the Iraqi Prime Minister.

Electoral lists for Iraqi elections